Malachi 4 is the fourth (and final) chapter of the Book of Malachi in the Hebrew Bible or the final chapter in the Old Testament of the Christian Bible. This book contains the prophecies attributed to the prophet Malachi, and is a part of the Book of the Twelve Minor Prophets.

Text 
The original text was written in Hebrew language. This chapter is divided into 6 verses. Masoretic texts do not have chapter 4, as all six verses are contained within chapter 3 as verses 19–24. This article generally follows the common numbering in Christian English Bible versions, with notes to the numbering in Hebrew Bible versions.

The New King James Version entitles this chapter "The Great Day of God".

Textual witnesses
Some early manuscripts containing the text of this chapter in Hebrew are of the Masoretic Text, which includes the Codex Cairensis (895), the Petersburg Codex of the Prophets (916), Aleppo Codex (10th century), Codex Leningradensis (1008). Fragments containing parts of this chapter were found among the Dead Sea Scrolls, including 4Q76 (4QXIIa; 150–125 BCE) with extant verses 1–6 (verses 3:19–24 in Masoretic Text).

There is also a translation into Koine Greek known as the Septuagint, made in the last few centuries BCE. Extant ancient manuscripts of the Septuagint version include Codex Vaticanus (B; B; 4th century), Codex Sinaiticus (S; BHK: S; 4th century), Codex Alexandrinus (A; A; 5th century) and Codex Marchalianus (Q; Q; 6th century).

Verse 1
 "For behold, the day is coming,
 Burning like an oven,
 And all the proud, yes, all who do wickedly will be stubble.
 And the day which is coming shall burn them up,"
 Says the Lord of hosts,
 "That will leave them neither root nor branch."

 "The day is coming": referring to the "Day of Judgment" that Daniel had described the fire of that day (: "The throne (of the Ancient of days) was a fiery flame; his wheels a burning fire: a fiery stream issued and came forth from Him: the judgment was set and the books were opened"), accompanying the judgment (: "Our God shall come, and shall not keep silence, a fire shall devour before Him"; : "Behold the Lord will come with fire: for by fire and by the sword will the Lord plead with all flesh"; : "Every man's work shall be made manifest, for the day shall declare it, because it shall be revealed by fire: and the fire shall try every man's work, of what sort it is") the same way Peter writes about the fire that will be of this burning world (: "the heavens and the earth which are now, by the same word are kept in store, reserved unto fire against the day of judgment and perdition of' ungodly men; in the which the heavens shall pass away with a great noise, and the elements shall melt with fervent heat, the earth also and the works that are therein shall be burned up").
 "Burn like an oven" (a furnace): A symbol of the holiness of God, which consumes all impurity, and also represents the punishment inflicted on the ungodly (etc.). The Greek Septuagint has an addition "and it shall burn them."
 "Stubble" (cf. ); or, perhaps, "chaff", as in Matthew 3:11, 12. 
 "Root nor branch": referring to the "ungodly" which are regarded as a "tree which is given up to be burned so that nothing of it is left", a metaphor used by John the Baptist in Matthew 3:10 (cf. ).

Verse 2
 But unto you that fear my name
 shall the Sun of righteousness arise with healing in his wings;
 and ye shall go forth, and grow up
 as calves of the stall.
 "The Sun of Righteousness": This Divine righteousness shall beam upon them that fear the Name of God, flooding them with joy and light, healing all wounds, tee moving all miseries, making them incalculably blessed. The Fathers generally apply the title of "Sun of Righteousness" to Christ, who is the Source of all justification and enlightenment and happiness, and who is called (Jeremiah 23:6), "The Lord our Righteousness."
 "Grow up" rather, "gambol"; σκιρτήσετε (Septuagint); salietis (Vulgate). "Ye shall leap!" compare Jeremiah 1:11). The word is used of a horse galloping (Habbakuk 1:8). The happiness of the righteous is illustrated by a homely image drawn from pastoral pursuits. They had been, as it were, hidden in the time of affliction and temptation; they shall go forth boldly now, free and exulting, like calves driven from the stall to pasture (compare Psalm 114:4, 6; Song of Solomon 2:8, 17).
 "as calves of the stall" — which when set free from the stall disport with joy (Acts 8:8; 13:52; 20:24; Romans 14:17; Galatians 5:22; Philippians 1:4; 1 Peter 1:8). Especially the godly shall rejoice at their final deliverance at Christ's second coming (Isaiah 61:10).

Verse 3
 And ye shall tread down the wicked;
 for they shall be ashes under the soles of your feet
 in the day that I shall do this,
 saith the Lord of hosts.
 "And ye shall tread down the wicked": "As grapes in the winepress" (cf. Isaiah 63:2); Christian writers apply to Christ who will lead his people and through himself make them more than conquerors over all their enemies, both spiritual and temporal.

Verse 4
 Remember ye the law of Moses my servant,
 which I commanded unto him in Horeb for all Israel,
 with the statutes and judgments.
 "Law of Moses": The last of the prophets set his seal to the Pentateuch, on obedience to which depended, as of old (see Leviticus 26; Deuteronomy 28), so now, the most abundant blessings. 
 "My servant": Moses was only the agent and interpreter of God. The origin and authority of the Law were Divine. 
 "Horeb": The mention of this mountain would remind the people of the great wonders that accompanied the promulgation of the Law (Exodus 19:16, etc.; Deuteronomy 4:10-15) for all Israel and for all time, not just for those who heard the Law given at that time.

Verse 5
  Behold, I will send you Elijah the prophet
 before the coming of the great and dreadful day of the Lord:
 "I send you Elijah" — as a means towards your "remembering the law" (Malachi 4:4).
 "the prophet": emphatical; not "the Tishbite" as the Septuagint version wrongly inserts instead of prophet; not Elijah in person, who lived in the times of Ahab; for it is in his official, not his personal capacity, that his coming is here predicted.
 "The great and dreadful day": The day of final judgment. No other crisis could be named in such terms (see , whence the words are taken). The Jews interpret that as "before the coming of Christ the son of David". The Talmud interprets (s) this of the sorrows of the Messiah, or which shall be in the days of the Messiah.

Verse 6
 And he shall turn the heart of the fathers to the children,
 and the heart of the children to their fathers, 
 lest I come and smite the earth with a curse.

 "Lest I come and smite the earth with a curse": that is, with an utter destruction, from which there should be no redemption. In the end, God will destroy the earth, and those not receiving Him, but the prayer and zeal of Elijah will gain a reprieve, in which God will spare the world for the gathering of His own elect, the full conversion of the Jews, which shall fulfill Paul's words Romans 11:26, "So shall all Israel be saved."

After the glad tidings, Malachi, and the Old Testament in him, ends with words of awe, telling us of the consequence of the final hardening of the heart; the eternal severance, when the unending end of the everlasting Gospel itself shall be accomplished, and its last grain shall be gathered into the garner of the Lord.

Elijah the prophet 
This chapter states "Elijah the prophet" not "Elijah the Tishbite" for it is in his official, not his personal capacity, that his coming is here predicted. In this sense, John the Baptist was an Elijah in spirit, but not the literal Elijah.

The Archangel Gabriel interprets this for us, to include the sending of "John the Immerser" (John the Baptist). For he not only says  to Zechariah the priest, John's father, that he shall "go before" the Lord "in the spirit and power of Elias," but describes his mission in the characteristic words of Malachi (Malachi 4:5), "to turn the hearts of the fathers to the children:" and those other words also, "and the disobedient to the wisdom of the just," perhaps represent the sequel in Malachi, "and the hearts of the children to the fathers;" for their hearts could only be so turned by conversion to God, whom the fathers, patriarchs and prophets, knew, loved and served; and whom they served in name only.

When John the Baptist was asked, "Art thou Elias?" (John 1:21), he answered, "I am not." "Art thou that prophet?" "No." In denying that he was Elias, denied only, that he was that great prophet himself. Though knowing from the angel's announcement to his father that he was referred to by Malachi 4:5, whence he wore the costume of Elijah, yet knew by inspiration that he did not exhaustively fulfil all that is included in this prophecy: that there is a further fulfilment (compare Malachi 3:1).

Jesus spoke in Matthew 11:14, "This is Elias, which was for to come  that Elias is come already and they knew him not, but have done unto him whatsoever they listed," in correcting the error of the scribes, who said that He could not be the Christ, because Elias was not yet come. This must also be the fullest fulfillment. "For the great and terrible Day of the Lord" is the Day of Judgment, of which all earthly judgments, however desolating, (as the destruction of Jerusalem) are but shadows and earnests. Before our Lord's coming all things looked on to His first coming, and, since that coming, all looks on to the second, which is the completion of the first and of all things in time.

As Moses in Malachi 4:4 represents the law, so Elijah represents the prophets. The Jews always understood it of the literal Elijah. Their saying is, "Messiah must be anointed by Elijah." There seems to be no valid reason for not holding the literal sense of the words, and seeing in them a promise that Elijah the prophet, who was taken alive from the earth, shall at the last day come again to carry out God's wise purposes. Christ himself confirms this opinion by answering, "Elias truly shall first come, and restore all things." He cannot be referring here to John the Baptist, because he uses the future tense; and when he goes on to say that "Elias is come already," he is referring to what was past, and he himself explains that he means John, who was announced to come in the spirit and power of Elias, but of whom it could not be said that he "restored all things."

As there is another consummating advent of Messiah Himself, so also of His forerunner Elijah; perhaps in person, as at the transfiguration (compare ). He in his appearance at the transfiguration in that body on which death had never passed is the forerunner of the saints who shall be found alive at the Lord's second coming.  may refer to the same witnesses as at the transfiguration, Moses and Elijah;  identifies the latter (compare). Even after the transfiguration Jesus speaks of Elijah's coming "to restore all things" as still future, though He adds that Elijah (in the person of John the Baptist) is come already in a sense (compare ). The words "before the … dreadful day of the Lord," show that John cannot be exclusively meant; for he came before the day of Christ's coming in grace, not before His coming in terror, of which last the destruction of Jerusalem was the earnest (Malachi 4:1; Joel 2:31).

As John the Baptist came, in the spirit and power of Elias, before His first coming, so, before the second coming, Elijah should come in person, as Jews and Christians have alike expected. This has been the Christian expectation from the first. 
 Justin Martyr asked his opponent "Shall we not conceive that the Word of God has proclaimed Elias to be the forerunner of the great and terrible day of His second Coming?" "Certainly," was Trypho's reply. Justin continues, "Our Lord Himself taught us in His own teaching that this very thing shall be, when the said that 'Elias also shall come;' and we know that this shall be fulfilled, when He is about to come from heaven in glory."
 Tertullian says "Elias is to come again, not after a departure from life, but after a translation; not to be restored to the body, from which he was never taken; but to be restored to the world, from which he was translated; not by way of restoration to life, but for the completion of prophecy; one and the same in name and in person." "Enoch and Elias were translated, and their death is not recorded, as being deferred; but they are reserved as to die, that they may vanquish Antichrist by their blood."
 Origen says simply in one place, that the Saviour answered the question as to the objection of the Scribes, "not annulling what had been handed down concerning Elias, but affirming that there was another coming of Elias before Christ, unknown to the scribes, according to which, not knowing him, and, being in a manner, accomplices in his being cast into prison by Herod and slain by him, they had done to him what they listed."
 Hippolytus has, "As two Comings of our Lord and Saviour were indicated by the Scriptures, the first in the flesh, in dishonor, that He might be set at naught - the second in glory, when He shall come from heaven with the heavenly host and the glory of the Father - so two forerunners were pointed out, the first, John, the son of Zacharias, and again - since He is manifested as Judge at the end of the world, His forerunners must first appear, as He says through Malachi, 'I will send to you Elias the Tishbite before the great and terrible day of the Lord shall come. '"
 Hilary, "The Apostles inquire in anxiety about the times of Elias. To whom He answereth, that "Elias will come and restore all things," that is, will recall to the knowledge of God, what he shall find of Israel; but he signifies that John came "in the spirit and power of Elias," to whom they had shown all severe and harsh dealings, that, foreannouncing the Coming of the Lord, he might be a forerunner of the Passion also by an example of wrong and harass." "We understand that those same prophets (Moses and Elias) will come before His Coming, who, the Apocalypse of John says, will be slain by Antichrist, although there are various opinions of very many, as to Enoch or Jeremiah, that one of them is to die, as Elias."
 Hilary the Deacon, AD 355, has on the words, "I suppose God hath set forth us the Apostles last;" "He therefore applies these to his own person, because he was always in distress, suffering, beyond the rest, persecutions and distresses, as Enoch and Elias will suffer, who will be Apostles at the last time. For they have to be sent before Christ, to make ready the people of God, and fortify all the Churches to resist Antichrist, of whom the Apocalypse attests, that they will suffer persecutions and be slain." "When the faithless shall be secure of the kingdom of the devil, the saints, i. e., Enoch and Elias being slain, rejoicing in the victory, and 'sending gifts, one to another' as the Apocalypse says Revelation 11:10 sudden destruction shall come upon them. For Christ at His Coming, shall destroy them all." Gregory of Nyssa quotes the prophecy under the heading, that "before the second Coming of our Lord, Elias should come."
 Ambrose writes "Because the Lord was to come down from heaven, and to ascend to heaven, He raised Elias to heaven, to bring him back to the earth at the time He should please." "The beast, Antichrist, ascends from the abyss to fight against Elias and Enoch and John, who are restored to the earth for the testimony to the Lord Jesus, as we read in the Apocalypse of John."
 Jerome gives here the mystical meaning; "God will send, in Elias (which is interpreted 'My God' and wire is of the town Thisbe, which signifies 'conversion' or 'penitence') the whole choir of the prophets, "to convert the heart of the fathers to the sons," namely, Abraham and Isaac and Jacob and all the patriarchs, that their posterity may believe in the Lord the Saviour, in whom themselves believed: 'for Abraham saw the day of the Lord and was glad.'" Here, he speaks of the "coming of Elias before their anointed," as a supposition of Jews and Judaizing heretics. But in commenting on our Lord's words in Matthew, he adheres twice to the literal meaning. On Matthew 11:14-15, "Some think that John is therefore called Elias, because, as, according to Malachi, at the second coming of the Saviour. On Matthew 17:11-12, Elias will precede and announce the Judge to come, so did John at His first coming, and each is a messenger, of the first or second coming of the Lord:" and again concisely, On Matthew 17:11-12, "He who is to come in the second Coining of the Saviour in the actual body, now comes through John in spirit and power;" and he speaks of Enoch and Elias as "the two witnesses in the Revelation, since, according to the Apocalypse of John, Enoch and Elias are spoken of, as having to die."
 Chrysostom, "When He saith that Elias "cometh and shall restore all things," He means Elias himself, and the conversion of the Jews, which shall then be; but when He saith, "which was to come," He calls John, Elias, according to the manner of his ministry."
 In Augustine's time it was the universal belief. , "When he (Malachi) had admonished them to remember the law of Moses, because he foresaw, that they would for a long time not receive it spiritually, as it ought, he added immediately; "And I will send you Elias the Thisbite" etc. That when, through this Elias, the great and wonderful prophet, at the last time before the judgment, the law shall have been expounded to them, the Jews shall believe in the true Christ, i. e., in our Christ, is everywhere in the mouths and hearts of the faithful. For not without reason is it hoped, that he shall come before the Coming of the Saviour, as Judge, because not without reason is it believed that he still lives. For he was carried in a chariot of fire from things below; which Scripture most evidently attests. When he shall come then, by expounding the law spiritually, which the Jews now understand carnally, he shall turn the heart of the fathers to the children."
 Cyril of Alexandria, his antagonist Theodoret, and Theodore of Mopsuestia, who was loose from all tradition, had the same clear belief. Cyril writes "It is demonstrative of the gentleness and long-suffering of God, that Elias also the Tishbite shall shine upon us, to foreannounce when the Judge shall come to those in the whole world. For the Son shall come down, as Judge, in the glory of the Father, attended by the angels, and shall 'sit on the throne of His glory, judging the world in righteousness, and shall reward every man according to his works.' But since we are in many sins, well is it for us, that the divine prophet goes before Him, bringing all those on earth to one mind; that all, being brought to the unity through the faith, and ceasing from evil intents, may fulfill that which is good, and so be saved when the Judge cometh down. The blessed John the Baptist came before Him "in the spirit and power of Elias." But, as he preached saying, 'Prepare ye the way of the Lord, make His paths straight,' so also the divine Elias proclaims His then being near and all-but-present, that He may 'judge the world in righteousness.'"
 Theodoret writes "Malachi teaches us how, when Antichrist shall presume on these things, the great Elias shall appear, preaching to the Jews the coming of Christ: and he shall convert many, for this is the meaning of, "he shall turn the heart of the fathers to the children," i. e., the Jews (for these he calls fathers, as being older in knowledge) to those who believed from the Gentiles. They who shall believe through the preaching of the great Elias, and shall join themselves to the Gentiles who seized the salvation sent to them, shall become one church. He hints, how when these things are done by Antichrist, Michael the Archangel will set all in motion, that Elias should come and foreannounce the coming of the Lord that the then Jews may obtain salvation." And on this place, "Knowing well, that they would neither obey the law, nor receive Him when He came, but would deliver Him to be crucified, He promises them, in His unspeakable love for man, that He will again send Elias as a herald of salvation, 'Lo, I will send you Elias the Tishbite.' And signifying the time, He added, 'Before the great and terrible day of the Lord shall come:' He named the Day of His Second Coming. But He teaches us, what the great Elias shall do, when he comes, 'Who shall bring back the heart of the father to the son' etc. And pointing out the end, for which Elias should first come, 'Lest I come and smite the earth utterly.' For lest, finding you all in unbelief, I send you all to that endless punishment, Elias will first come, and will persuade you, O Jews, to unite you indissolubly with those, who from the Gentiles believe in Me, and to be united to My one Church."
 Theodore of Mopsuestia paraphrases: "In addition to all which I have said, I give you this last commandment, to remember My law, which I gave to all Israel through Moses, plainly declaring what they ought to do in each thing, and as the first token of obedience, to receive the Lord Christ when He cometh, appearing for the salvation of all men: Who will end the law, but show His own perfection. It had been well, had you immediately believed Him when He came, and known Him, as He whom Moses and all the prophets signified, Who should put an end to the law, and reveal the common salvation of all men, so that it should be manifest to all, that this is the sum and chief good of the whole dispensation of the law, to bring all men to the Lord Christ, Who, for those great goods, should be manifested in His own time. But since, when He manifested Himself, ye manifested your own ungainliness, the blessed Elias shall be sent to you before the second Coming of Christ, when He will come from heaven, to unite those who, for religion, are separated from each other, and, through the knowledge of religion, to bring the fathers to one-mindedness with the children, and in a word, to bring all men to one and the same harmony, when those, then found in ungodliness, shall receive from him the knowledge of the truth in the communion with the godly thence ensuing."
 The African author of the work on the promises and predictions of God." (between AD 450 and 455), "Against Antichrist shall be sent two witnesses, the prophets Enoch and Elijah, against whom shall arise three false prophets of Antichrist."
 Isidore of Seville (AD 595) writes, "Elias, borne in a chariot of fire, ascended to heaven, to come according to the prophet Malachi at the end of the world, and to precede Christ, to announce His last coming, with great deeds and wondrous signs, so that, on earth too, Antichrist will war against him, be against him, or him who is to come with him, and will slay them; their bodies also will lie unburied in the streets. Then, raised by the Lord, they will smite the kingdom of Antichrist with a great blow. After this, the Lord will come, and will slay Antichrist with the word of His mouth, and those who worshiped him." , "This will be in the last times, when, on the preaching of Elias, Judah will be converted to Christ."
 For his great gifts, Gregory the Great writes, "It is promised, that when Elias shall come, he shall bring back the hearts of the sons to their fathers, that the doctrine of the old, which is now taken from the hearts of the Jews, may, in the mercy of God, return, when the sons shall begin to understand of the Lord God, what the fathers taught." , "Although Elias is related to have been carried to heaven, he deferred, he did not escape, death. For it is said of him by the mouth of the Truth Himself, 'Elias shall come and restore all things.' He shall come to 'restore all things;' for to this end is he restored to this world, that he may both fulfill the office of preaching, and pay the debt of the flesh." , "The holy Church, although it now loses many through the shock of temptation, yet, at the end of the world, it receives its own double, when, having received the Gentiles to the full, all Judaea too, which shall then be, agrees to hasten to its faith. For hence it is written, "Until the fullness of the Gentiles shall come, and so all Israel shall be saved." Hence, in the Gospel the Truth says, "Elias shall come and shall restore all things." For now the Church has lost the Israelites, whom it could not convert by preaching; but then, at the preaching of Elias, while it collects all which it shall find, it receives in a manner more fully what it has lost." , "John is spoken of as to come in the spirit and power of Elias, because, as Elias shall precede the second Coming of the Lord, so John preceded His first. For as Elias will come, as precursor of the Judge, so John was made the precursor of the Redeemer. John then was Elias in spirit; he was not Elias in person. What then the Lord owned as to spirit, that John denies as to the person."

Whether Elijah is one of the two witnesses spoken of in the Apocalypse, is obviously a distinct question. Of commentators on the Apocalypse, Arethas remarks that as to Elijah, there is clear testimony from Holy Scripture, this of Malachi; but that, with regard to Enoch, we have only the fact of his being freed from death by translation, and the tradition of the Church. John Damascene fixed the belief in the Eastern Church. In the West, Bede e. g., who speaks of the belief that the two witnesses were Elijah and Enoch, as what was said by "some doctors," takes our Lord's declaration, that Elijah shall return, in its simple meaning. When the belief as to a personal Antichrist was changed by Luther and Calvin, the belief of a personal forerunner of Christ gave way also.

The same opinion is found in the Revelation (Revelation 11:3, 6), where one of the witnesses is very commonly supposed to be Elijah. But, as Knabenbauer points out, for the attribution of the name David to Messiah, long and careful preparation had been made; e.g. by his being called "the rod of Jesse," the occupant of David's throne, etc.; and all who heard the expression would at once understand the symbolical application, especially as David was known to have died and been buried. But when they found Malachi speaking of the reappearance of "Elijah the prophet," who, as they were well aware, had never died, of whose connection with the coming Messenger they had never heard, they could not avoid the conclusion to which they came, viz. that before the great day of judgment Elias should again visit the earth in person.

See also

Related Bible parts: Exodus 20, Jeremiah 23, Joel 2, Malachi 3, Matthew 3, Matthew 5, Matthew 11, Luke 1, 2 Peter 3, Revelation 11

Notes and references

Sources

External links

Jewish
Malachi 3 Hebrew with Parallel English
Malachi 3 Hebrew with Rashi's Commentary

Christian
Malachi 4 English Translation with Parallel Latin Vulgate

04